San Ramón  may refer to:

Places

San Ramón de la Nueva Orán, Argentina
San Ramón, Beni, Bolivia
San Ramón Municipality, Beni, Bolivia
San Ramón River, Bolivia
San Ramón, Santa Cruz, Bolivia
San Ramón, Costa Rica
San Ramón (canton), Alajuela, Costa Rica
San Ramón, Chile
San Ramón metro station
San Ramón, Cuscatlán, El Salvador
San Ramón, Choluteca, Honduras
San Ramón, Matagalpa, Nicaragua
San Ramón District, Chanchamayo, Peru
San Ramón, Junín, Peru
Apostolic Vicariate of San Ramón
San Ramon, Gandara, Samar, Philippines
Sant Ramon, Lleida, Spain
San Ramon, California, United States
San Ramon Valley, California, United States
San Ramon Village, California, United States
San Ramón, Uruguay

Other uses
San Ramon (coffee), a Brazilian Arabica variety
San Ramón Fault, a geological fault in Chile

See also
Saint Raymond (disambiguation)